Yudhabhoomi is a 1976 Indian Malayalam film,  directed by Crossbelt Mani and produced by Thiruvonam Pictures. The film stars KP Ummer, Vidhubala, Cochin Haneefa and Bahadoor in the lead roles. The film has musical score by R. K. Shekhar.

Cast

K. P. Ummer
Vidhubala
Vincent
Rajakokila
Ravi Menon
Bahadoor
Adoor Bhasi
Sreelatha Namboothiri
Cochin Haneefa
Balan K. Nair
Kuthiravattam Pappu
Meena
Reena
Vettoor Purushan

Soundtrack
The music was composed by R. K. Shekhar and the lyrics were written by Mankombu Gopalakrishnan and Bharanikkavu Sivakumar.

References

External links
 

1976 films
1970s Malayalam-language films